

Events and publications

January 

January 6: Hildie and the Kid Gang, by Will Eisner.
January 23: In Italy, the first number of Albi dell’intrepido by Editrice Universo, is published.
Captain America Comics (1941 series) #52 - Timely Comics
 Marvel Mystery Comics (1939 series) #68 - Timely Comics
 In Walt Disney's Comics and Stories, Donald tames his temper, by Carl Barks.

February
 February 2: Jean Dulieu's Paulus de Boskabouter (Paulus the woodgnome) debuts in Het Vrije Volk.
 February 7: Buth's Thomas Pips makes its debut in Het Volk.
Captain America Comics (1941 series) #53 - Timely Comics
Marvel Mystery Comics (1939 series) #69 - Timely Comics

March
 March 1: The National Cartoonists Society is established, along with the annual award, the Billy DeBeck Memorial Award, which will be renamed the Reuben Award in 1954.
 March 3: Milton Caniff's Male Call comes to its conclusion after three years of newspaper publication.
 March 4: Alex Raymond's Rip Kirby makes its debut. with The Chip Faraday Murder. The series will run until 1996. 
March 12: The first issue of the comics magazine Treasure Chest is published.
March 24: The Last Trolley aka The Man who Killed the Spirit, by Will Eisner.
Captain America Comics (1941 series) #54 - Timely Comics
Marvel Mystery Comics (1939 series) #70 - Timely Comics
Young Allies Comics (1941 series) #19 - Timely Comics
Master Ice-Fisher by Carl Barks, on Walt Disney's Comics and Stories.

April
 April 15: Ed Dodd's newspaper comic Mark Trail is first published in the New York Post. 
 April 22: First publication of Machiko Hasegawa's manga series  Sazae-san in Fukunichi Shimbun.
Captain America Comics (1941 series) #55 - Timely Comics
Human Torch Comics (1940 series) #22 - Timely Comics
Marvel Mystery Comics (1939 series) #71 - Timely Comics
Sub-Mariner Comics (1941 series) #19 - Timely Comics
The Hicks formula, by Alex Raymond, second adventure of Rip Kirby.

May
 May 12: Andrea Lavezzolo and Edgardo dell'Acqua's comic strip Gim Toro makes its debut.
 May 15: Willy Vandersteen's Suske en Wiske story De Sprietatoom is first published. Halfway the story Lambik makes his debut.
Captain America Comics (1941 series) #56 - Timely Comics
Marvel Mystery Comics (1939 series) #72 - Timely Comics
 The first number of Albi d’Oro (Golden albums), anthological magazine edited by Mondadori, centered moreover on the Disney comics.

June
 In Al Capp's Li'l Abner the character Lena the Hyena is introduced. "The world's ugliest woman" is an unseen character who is always obscured from view, but characters react in horror to her ugliness. Her face will finally be revealed five months later.
All-Winners Comics (1941 series) #18 - Timely Comics
Marvel Mystery Comics (1939 series) #73 - Timely Comics
Sub-Mariner Comics (1941 series) #20 - Timely Comics
 In the Rip Kirby story Liquid murder, by Alex Raymond Rip Kirby meets his nemesis, the Mangler.

July
 July 5: Hans G. Kresse's Eric de Noorman debuts in Het Laatste Nieuws.
 July 14: In Will Eisner's The Spirit the recurring villain Octopus makes his debut. 
July 15: The first issue of Fantax magazine is published. The character, by Marcel Navarro and Pierre Mouchot, had debuted two months earlier on Paris-Monde Illustré. 
Captain America Comics (1941 series) #57 - Timely Comics
Human Torch Comics (1940 series) #23 - Timely Comics
Marvel Mystery Comics (1939 series) #74 - Timely Comics
In the French weekly magazine Vaillant, organ of MJCF, first adventure of the pilot Bob Mallard, by Jean Sanitas.

August
 August 1: Willy Vandersteen's De Vrolijke Bengels (1946-1954) makes its debut in Ons Volkske.
 August 12: first strip of Battle on the moon. 
 August 26: In Chester Gould's Dick Tracy Breathless Mahoney is killed.
Marvel Mystery Comics (1939 series) #75 - Timely Comics

September
September 2: the Chicago Tribune Syndacate publishes the first strip of Aggie Mack, by Hal Rasmusson. 
September 7: The first number of Albi dell’ardimento (Bravery albums), an anthological magazine is published, edited by Edizioni Alpe, centering on Western comics.
 September 9: Honey and Hank, aka Elsworth by Bernard Segal, aka Seeg, makes its debut. It will run until 1958.
September 20: The British comics magazine The Comet is first published. It will run until 17 October 1959, after which it merges into the magazine Tiger.
September 23: The Mickey Mouse story Mickey’s menagerie, by Floyd Gottfredson and Bill Walsh is first published.
 September 26: 
 The first issue of the Belgian comics magazine  (Tintin) is published by Raymond Leblanc. The magazine will run until 1993. This also marks the continuation of The Adventures of Tintin by Hergé, which had been interrupted after World War II. The first issue contains the opening chapter of Edgr P. Jacobs’ The Secret of the Swordfish 
 Edgar P. Jacobs' Blake and Mortimer by Edgar P. Jacobs debuts in Tintin.
 Paul Cuvelier's Corentin debuts in Tintin.
 September 30: National Periodical Publications is established, from a merger of All-American Publications and Detective Comics, Inc.
All-Winners Comics (1941 series) #19 - Timely Comics
Captain America Comics (1941 series) #58 - Timely Comics
Marvel Mystery Comics (1939 series) #76 - Timely Comics
Sub-Mariner Comics (1941 series) #21 - Timely Comics

October
 October 21: After five months of playing with readers' expectations the previously unseen character Lena the Hyena in Al Capp's comic strip Li'l Abner is finally revealed to the audience. Her design was part of a readers' contest won by a still unknown cartoonist Basil Wolverton. The exposure finally launches his career.
October 26: In the Italian Disney magazine Topolino, the SF series Saturno contro la terra (Saturn vs. Earth), by Cesare Zavattini,  Federico Pedrocchi and Giovanni Scolari, gets its final chapter. It had continued since 1936, with a two-year break-up because of the war. 
Cesare Solini and Antonio Canale's Amok makes its debut.
Human Torch Comics (1940 series) #24 - Timely Comics
Marvel Mystery Comics (1939 series) #77 - Timely Comics
Young Allies Comics (1941 series) #20 - Timely Comics - (Final Issue)
Ipnos il re della magia (Ipnos king of magic), by Gian Luigi Bonelli and Carlo Cossio, edited by Edizioni Audace; Italian imitation of Mandrake.

November
 November 15: First publication of the Filipino comics magazine Halakhak Komiks.
All-Winners Comics (1941 series) #21 - Timely Comics - (Issue #20 was never released, and issue #21 was the final issue.)
Captain America Comics (1941 series) #59 - Timely Comics
Human Torch Comics (1940 series) #25 - Timely Comics
Marvel Mystery Comics (1939 series) #78 - Timely Comics

December
 December 7: First appearance of Lucky Luke and his trusty horse Jolly Jumper by Morris, in Spirou with the story Arizona 1880.
December 12: In the French magazine OK,  the first chapter of Arys Buck et son épée magique (Arys Buck and his magical sword), by Albert Uderzo is published. In 1946 he also publishes his first album, Les Aventures de Clopinard. 
 December 23: Marten Toonder's Panda makes its newspaper debut.
Marvel Mystery Comics (1939 series) #79 - Timely Comics
In Vaillant, Nasdine Hodja, by Roger Lecaux, a sort of Robin Hood living in the Arabian nights’ world, makes his debut.

Year overall 
John Willie creates the Sweet Gwendolyne character in the erotic magazine Bizarre, published by himself.
In Il vittorioso, Benito Jacovitti publishes a comic version of Collodi’s The adventures of Pinocchio.

Births

February
 February 20: Norbert Morandière, aka Norma, French comics artist (Capitaine Apache, Souvenirs de la Pendule, Hazel et Ogan), (d. 2021).

November
 November 12: Kazuyoshi Torii, Japanese manga artist, (d. 2022).
 November 29: Carlos Leopardi, Argentine comics artist (Atila, worked on Nippur de Lagash), (d. 2004).

Deaths

January
 January 2: O'Galop, French painter, illustrator, graphic designer, animator and comics artist (Le Supplice de la Roue, Fifi Céleri), passes away at age 78.
 March 2: Don Newhouse, British comics artist (Bertie Blobbs, comics based on Charlie Chaplin, continued Pitch and Toss, Our Saucy Shipwrecked Mariners), dies at age 62.

June
 June 15: Charles Forbell, American comics artist (Naughty Pete), dies at age 71.

August
 August 3: Viktor Deni, Russian cartoonist and poster designer (made sequential propaganda cartoons and comics), dies at age 53.

September
 September 3: Constant Dratz, Belgian painter, poster artist and comic artist (L'Étrange Aventure de Tom-Tom aux Amériques), dies at age 71. 
 September 16: Francisque Poulbot, French illustrator and cartoonist, dies at age 67.

October
 October 5: Monte Crews, American illustrator and comic artist (The Mysterious Family Next Door), dies at age 88. 
 October 24: Dmitry Moor, Russian artist, poster designer and cartoonist, dies at age 62.

Specific date unknown
 Benjamin Kilvert, American illustrator, painter and comics artist (Muffy Shuffles), dies at age 66 or 67. 
 Albert Lanmour, French illustrator and comics artist (Les Années de Service de Théodore Tiroflan, Le Hoquet d'Hector Boyaux), dies at age 58 or 59.
 Red W. Shellcope, American comics artist (Jimmie the Messenger Boy), dies at age 66 or 67.

Initial appearances by character name
 Fantax, created by  Marcel Navarro and Pierre Mouchot.
 Lambik by Willy Vandersteen.
Morgaine le Fey in Batman #36 - DC Comics

References